This is a list of Belgian television related events from 1977.

Events
5 February - Dream Express are selected to represent Belgium at the 1977 Eurovision Song Contest with their song "A Million in One, Two, Three". They are selected to be the twenty-second Belgian Eurovision entry during Eurosong held at the Amerikaans Theater in Brussels.

Debuts

Television shows

Ending this year

Births
10 February - Catherine Moerkerke, newsreader
26 July - Kelly Pfaff, TV host, model, dancer & singer

Deaths